Holophysis xanthostoma is a moth of the family Gelechiidae. It was described by Walsingham in 1910. It is found in Mexico (Guerrero).

The wingspan is about 9 mm. The forewings are dark bronzy brown, shading into shining brassy metallic along the dorsum below the fold, and in a broad oblique terminal band. Two shining pale aeneous costal spots, one near the base, the other a little before the middle, are followed by two minute white costal dots, one about the middle, the other beyond. The hindwings are brown, paler than the forewings.

References

Moths described in 1910
Holophysis